Proteus is an early Greek water god

Proteus may also refer to:

People 
 Charles Proteus Steinmetz (1865–1923), German-American mathematician and electrical engineer
 Peregrinus Proteus (died 165), Cynic philosopher, from Parium in Mysia
 Proteus (Greek myth), name of multiple mythical characters
 Proteus of Egypt, an ancient Egyptian king who was associated with the island of Pharos

Characters 
 Proteus (The Two Gentlemen of Verona), a character from William Shakespeare's play The Two Gentlemen of Verona
 Dr. Paul Proteus, the main character in Player Piano by Kurt Vonnegut
 Prince Proteus of Syracuse, a character in the 2003 DreamWorks Animation film Sinbad: Legend of the Seven Seas
 Proteus, the Prime Minister in The Apple Cart by George Bernard Shaw
 Proteus IV, a villainous supercomputer in the Dean Koontz novel and film Demon Seed
 Proteus, the second monster created by Victor Frankenstein in the TV show Penny Dreadful

Characters in comics 
 Proteus (Marvel Comics), a Marvel Comics mutant
 Proteus (DC Comics), a DC Comics super-villain, enemy of the superhero the Creeper

Biology 
 Amoeba proteus, the most famous species of amoebae
 Proteus (amphibian), a small cave-dwelling amphibian genus, also known as the olm
 Proteus (bacterium), a genus of Proteobacteria responsible for many human urinary tract infections
 Proteus, a cultivar of Clematis introduced in 1876

Medicine 
 Proteus syndrome, a very rare congenital disorder known mostly for its most famous sufferer Joseph Merrick (the Elephant Man)
 Proteus-like syndrome, a condition similar to Proteus syndrome, but with an uncertain etiology

Physics 
 Proteus (alchemy), a term for the "first matter" (prima materia)
 Proteus (moon), a natural satellite of Neptune
 Proteus (satellite), a French multimission satellite platform

Software and hardware 
 Proteus (programming language), a fully functional, procedural programming language created in 1998 by Simone Zanella
 Proteus (proteomics software), a software using Trans-Proteomic Pipeline technology
 Proteus (video game), an exploration video game created in 2013
 Proteus Design Suite, a proprietary software tool suite used primarily for electronic design automation

In media 
 Proteus (play), a satyr play by Aeschylus, part of the Oresteia
 "Proteus" (X-Men episode), an episode of the X-Men animated series 
 Proteus (video game), a 2013 video game developed by Ed Key and David Kanaga
 "Proteus", an episode of the television series Person of Interest

Films 
 Proteus, a 1995 film by director Bob Keen
 Proteus (2003 film), a film by Canadian director John Greyson
 Proteus (2004 film), an animated documentary by David Lebrun

Novels 
 Proteus In The Underworld, a science fiction novel by Charles Sheffield and published in 1995
 The Proteus Operation, a science fiction novel written by James P. Hogan and published in 1985
 "Proteus" (Ulysses episode), an episode in James Joyce's novel Ulysses
 Proteus, a novel by Morris West and published in 1979

Vehicles 
 Bluebird-Proteus CN7, a technologically advanced wheel-driven land speed record-breaking car
 HMS Proteus (disambiguation), several ships
 Proteus (watercraft), an experimental vessel developed by Marine Advanced Research
 Scaled Composites Proteus, an experimental aircraft
 USS Proteus (disambiguation), several ships
 A type of diver propulsion vehicle, ; there are at least two makes called Proteus:
 Protei-5 Russian diver-rider
 Proteus replica Jaguar C-Type car, manufactured in the UK by Proteus sports and racing cars

Fictional vehicles 
 Proteus (submarine), the miniaturized submarine in the 1966 movie Fantastic Voyage
 Proteus, a derelict spacecraft infested with alien spiders in the 1998 film Lost in Space
 Proteus, a Strategic Cruiser class ship from the MMORPG Eve Online
 Proteus, a new US Navy warship in a season 2 episode of New Captain Scarlet entitled Proteus

Engines 
 Bristol Proteus, a turboprop engine

Organisations 
 Proteus-eretes, the largest student rowing club in Delft, Netherlands
 Proteus Gowanus, an interdisciplinary gallery and reading room founded in 2005 in Gowanus, Brooklyn, New York, United States
 Krewe of Proteus, the second oldest parade krewe at New Orleans Mardi Gras

Companies 
 Proteus Airlines, a French regional airline with its head offices in Saint-Apollinaire, Côte-d'Or, France, near Dijon, and in Saint-Étienne
 Studio Proteus, a Japanese manga import, translation and lettering company

Other 
 E-mu Proteus, a series of sample playback synthesizers
 Proteus, a board game by Steve Jackson Games
 Proteus effect, an effect that appears when the behavior of an individual conforms to their digital self-representation
 Proteus phenomenon, the tendency in science for early replications of a work to contradict the original findings, a consequence of publication bias
 Proteus (journal), academic journal from Slovenia

See also  
 Proteans (body language), a class of subtle body language flirting signals
 Protea (disambiguation)
 A. proteus (disambiguation)
 Protei (disambiguation)
 Proetus, name of multiple Greek mythical characters
 Proetus (trilobite), a genus of trilobite